Serbia participated in the Eurovision Song Contest 2009 with the song "Cipela" written by Aleksandar Kobac, Marko Kon and Milan Nikolić. The song was performed by Marko Kon and Milaan. The Serbian national broadcaster, Radio Television of Serbia (RTS) organised the national final Beovizija 2009 in order to select the Serbian entry for the 2009 contest in Moscow, Russia. The national final consisted of two shows: a semi-final and a final on 7 and 8 March 2009, respectively. Twenty entries competed in the semi-final where eleven qualified to the final following the combination of votes from a three-member jury panel and a public televote. The eleven qualifiers competed in the final which resulted in "Cipela" performed by Marko Kon and Milaan as the winner following the combination of votes from a three-member jury panel and a public televote.

Serbia was drawn to compete in the second semi-final of the Eurovision Song Contest which took place on 14 May 2009. Performing during the show in position 4, "Cipela" was not announced among the 10 qualifying entries of the second semi-final and therefore did not qualify to compete in the final. It was later revealed that Serbia placed tenth out of the 19 participating countries in the semi-final with 60 points.

Background 

Since 2007, all two of Serbia's entries have featured in the final. Serbia's 2008 entry "Oro" performed by Jelena Tomašević placed sixth in the final as the host country.

The Serbian national broadcaster, Radio Television of Serbia (RTS), broadcasts the event within Serbia and organises the selection process for the nation's entry. RTS confirmed their intentions to participate at the 2009 Eurovision Song Contest on 29 November 2008. Since 2007, Serbia used the Beovizija national final in order to select their entry and along with their participation confirmation, the broadcaster announced the organization of Beovizija 2009 in order to select the 2009 Serbian entry.

Before Eurovision

Beovizija 2009
Beovizija 2009 was the seventh edition of the Beovizija national final organised by RTS in order to select the Serbian entry for the Eurovision Song Contest 2009. The selection consisted of a semi-final featuring twenty songs and a final featuring eleven songs to be held on 7 and 8 March 2009, respectively, at the Sava Centar in Belgrade. Both shows were hosted by Jovana Janković, Milena Vasić and Srđan Timarov. The two shows were broadcast on RTS1, RTS Sat, in Bosnia and Herzegovina on RTRS, via radio on Radio Belgrade as well as streamed online via the broadcaster's website rts.rs.

Competing entries 
Artists and songwriters were able to submit their entries between 24 December 2008 and 24 January 2009. Both artists and songwriters were required to be Serb citizens, while songs were required to be submitted in Serbian. At the closing of the deadline, 90 submissions were received. A selection committee reviewed the submissions and selected twenty entries to proceed to the national final. The selection committee consisted of RTS music editors Jelena Ilić, Ana Milićević and Jelena Vlahović. The selected competing entries were announced on 30 January 2009. On 11 February 2009, Nataša Bekvalac announced her withdrawal from the national final due to scheduled performances and private obligations. Her song "Bili smo najlepši" was performed by Ana Nikolić instead.

Semi-final 
The semi-final took place on 7 March 2009 where twenty songs competed. The ten qualifiers for the final were decided by a combination of votes from a jury panel consisting of Jelena Jovičić (actress), Jovan Maljoković (musician and composer) and Ivan Ivačković (rock critic), and the Serbian public via SMS voting. Eurovision contestants Regina, Igor Cukrov and Andrea, Next Time, Andrea Demirović, and Quartissimo and Martina, which would represent Bosnia and Herzegovina, Croatia, Macedonia, Montenegro and Slovenia in 2009, respectively, were featured as guest performers during the show.

Following the semi-final, "Moje odbrane" performed by Ivana Selakov, which was initially announced as non-qualifiers during the show, was reinstated to the final due to technical errors in the public vote, where only votes cast during the first five minutes of the 10 minute voting period were counted. Originally, "Bili smo najlepši" performed by Ana Nikolić was also reinstated as a finalist, but Nikolić refused to participate in the final.

Final 
The final took place on 8 March 2009. The winner, "Cipela" performed by Marko Kon and Milan Nikolić, was decided by a combination of votes from a jury panel consisting of Željko Joksimović (represented Serbia and Montenegro in the Eurovision Song Contest 2004), Kornelije Kovač (musician and composer) and Biljana Krstić (musician), and the Serbian public via SMS voting. Former Eurovision contestants Sirusho, who represented Armenia in 2008, Boaz Ma'uda, who represented Israel in 2008, and Jelena Tomašević, who represented Serbia in 2008, were featured as guest performers during the show, performing together "Time to Pray", composed by Israeli President and Nobel Peace Prize winner Shimon Peres.

At Eurovision

According to Eurovision rules, all nations with the exceptions of the host country and the "Big Four" (France, Germany, Spain and the United Kingdom) are required to qualify from one of two semi-finals in order to compete for the final; the top nine songs from each semi-final as determined by televoting progress to the final, and a tenth was determined by back-up juries. The European Broadcasting Union (EBU) split up the competing countries into six different pots based on voting patterns from previous contests, with countries with favourable voting histories put into the same pot. On 30 January 2009, a special allocation draw was held which placed each country into one of the two semi-finals. Serbia was placed into the second semi-final, to be held on 14 May 2009. The running order for the semi-finals was decided through another draw on 16 March 2009 and Serbia was set to perform in position 4, following the entry from Latvia and before the entry from Poland.

The two semi-finals and the final were broadcast in Serbia on RTS1 and RTS Sat with commentary for the first semi-final by Dragan Ilić and commentary for the second semi-final and final by Duška Vučinić-Lučić. The Serbian spokesperson, who announced the Serbian votes during the final, was co-Presenter of the 2008 Eurovision Song Contest Jovana Janković.

Semi-final 
Marko Kon and Milaan took part in technical rehearsals on 4 and 7 May, followed by dress rehearsals on 11 and 12 May. The Serbian performance featured Marko Kon in a yellow jacket and Milaan in a black leather costume performing together with three male pantomimes and a female dancer in a white tulle dress, who was lifted up in the air and dropped to the floor during the performance. The background LED screens displayed pixelated sketches of the performers' faces. The director of the Serbian performance was Mojca Horvat and the choreography was completed by Milan Gromilić. The three pantomimes that joined Marko Kon and Milaan on stage were: Ljubiša Dinčić, Igor Knežević and Jovan Sejnjanović. The female dancer was Katarina Gromilić.

At the end of the show, Serbia was not announced among the 10 qualifying entries in the second semi-final and therefore failed to qualify to compete in the final. This marked the first time that Serbia failed to qualify to the final of the Eurovision Song Contest from a semi-final since its first entry in 2007. It was later revealed that Serbia placed tenth in the semi-final, receiving a total of 60 points; and whilist it would have been enough to qualify in previous years, in 2008 and 2009 only the top nine places qualified automatically and the tenth place was decided based on the votes of the backup juries, and this time, juries chose Croatia to qualify over Serbia.

Voting 
Voting during the three shows consisted of 50 percent public televoting and 50 percent from a jury deliberation. The jury consisted of five music industry professionals who were citizens of the country they represent. This jury was asked to judge each contestant based on: vocal capacity; the stage performance; the song's composition and originality; and the overall impression by the act. In addition, no member of a national jury could be related in any way to any of the competing acts in such a way that they cannot vote impartially and independently.

Below is a breakdown of points awarded to Serbia and awarded by Serbia in the second semi-final and grand final of the contest, and the breakdown of the jury voting and televoting conducted during the two shows:

Points awarded to Serbia

Points awarded by Country

Detailed voting results
The following members comprised the Serbian jury:

 Bilja Krstić – musician
 Jelena Tomašević – singer, represented Serbia in the 2008 contest
 Aleksandar Sedlar – musician
 Marko Đorđević – musician
 Vlada Maričić – musician

References

External links 
RTS
RTS Eurovision page

2009
Countries in the Eurovision Song Contest 2009
Eurovision